Zhadu Town is a rural town in Lengshuijiang, Loudi City, Hunan Province, People's Republic of China.

History
In 2015, Zilong Township was merged into Zhadu Town.

Administrative division
The town is divided into 13 villages and 2 communities, the following areas: Zhadu Community, Mufeng Community, Chaishan Village, Dishui Village, Fuxing Village, Heping Village, Houjia Village, Limin Village, Mugua Village, Shangtie Village, Shuangfeng Village, Tieshan Village, Yinxi Village, Zhadu Village, and Zifang Village (渣渡社区、木丰社区、柴山村、滴水村、复兴村、和平村、候家村、利民村、木瓜村、上铁村、双丰村、铁山村、银溪村、渣渡村、梓芳村)

Geography
The New Lian River flows through the town north to southeast.

References

Divisions of Lengshuijiang